"Never Stop" is a song by German pop group Bro'Sis. It was written by Jens Klein, Anders Herrlin, and Jennie Löfgren and produced by Thorsten Brötzmann for the band's second studio album Days of Our Lives (2003). Released as the album's lead single on 7 April 2003 on double A-side with Oh No", the pop rock-ballad became the group's sixth and final top ten entry on the German Singles Chart, peaking at number seven. It also marked the band's final release with Indira Weis who would announce her departure from Bro'Sis the following month.

Formats and track listings

Credits and personnel

 Ross Antony – vocals
 Hila Bronstein – vocals
 Thorsten Brötzmann – production, keyboards
 Nik Hafeman – supervising producer
 Benjamin Hüllenkremer – bass guitars
 Shaham Joyce – vocals

 Christoph Leis-Bendorff – mixing, keyboards
 Faiz Mangat – vocals
 Peter Weihe – guitars
 Indira Weis – vocals
 Giovanni Zarrella – vocals

Charts

Weekly charts

Year-end charts

References

2003 songs
Bro'Sis songs
Polydor Records singles